Sandy Gulch is a small community in Calaveras County, California, just southwest of West Point on State Route 26. The community is in ZIP code 95248 and area code 209.

It was established in 1849 as a trading center for miners of the area. The settlement, in an area that was home to many Miwok Indians, was named after the gulch where William and Dan Carsner found large nuggets of gold embedded in the coarse sands. Water for mining was brought from the middle fork of the Mokelumne River through Sandy Gulch and Kadish Ditches. Quartz mining began in the early 1850s, and the first custom stamp mill in the district was located at the head of Sandy Gulch. School and election precincts were established early, and one of California's many Hangman's Trees stood near the center of town.

It is registered as California Historical Landmark #253.

Sandy Gulch is marked by a cluster of homes surrounding the town baseball field. Sandy Gulch is also home to several small home businesses. As of 2016, its population was around 42.

Politics

References

External links

Unincorporated communities in California
Unincorporated communities in Calaveras County, California
California Historical Landmarks
Populated places established in 1849
1849 establishments in California